Stanhopea gibbosa is a species of orchids from Colombia and W-Ecuador. The name was often misapplied for a species from Costa Rica and Panama which was later described as Stanhopea confusa. Stanhopea carchiensis and Stanhopea impressa are synonyms of Stanhopea gibbosa.

External links 

gibbosa
Orchids of Costa Rica
Orchids of Nicaragua